17198 Gorjup, provisional designation , is a stony Flora asteroid and asteroid pair from the inner regions of the asteroid belt, approximately 2.7 kilometers in diameter. It was discovered on 3 January 2000, by the Lincoln Near-Earth Asteroid Research team at the Lincoln Laboratory Experimental Test Site in Socorro, New Mexico, United States. The asteroid was named for Slovenian Niko Gorjup, a 2003 awardee of the ISEF contest.

Orbit and classification 

Gorjup is a member of the Flora family, one of the largest families of stony asteroids. It orbits the Sun in the inner main-belt at a distance of 2.0–2.5 AU once every 3 years and 5 months (1,257 days). Its orbit has an eccentricity of 0.10 and an inclination of 3° with respect to the ecliptic.

Physical characteristics

Diameter estimate 

The Collaborative Asteroid Lightcurve Link assumes an albedo of 0.24 – derived from 8 Flora the family's largest member and namesake – and calculates a diameter of 2.71 kilometers with an absolute magnitude of 15.0.

Asteroid pair 

It is thought that asteroid pairs are formed by a single parent body, that broke up into a proto-binary system due to its rotation. Soon after, such systems disrupt under their own internal dynamics into pairs.

Lightcurve 

A rotational lightcurve of Gorjup was obtained from photometric observations made by Czech astronomer Petr Pravec at Ondřejov Observatory in August 2008. The lightcurve gave a well-defined rotation period of  hours with a brightness variation of 0.12 magnitude.

Naming 

This minor planet was named after Slovenian Niko Gorjup (born 1984) an awardee in the Intel International Science and Engineering Fair (ISEF) in 2003. At the time, he attended the Solski Center Nova Gorica, Gimnazija, Nova Gorica, Slovenia. The approved naming citation was published by the Minor Planet Center on 14 June 2004.

References

External links 
 Asteroid Lightcurve Database (LCDB), query form (info )
 Dictionary of Minor Planet Names, Google books
 Asteroids and comets rotation curves, CdR – Observatoire de Genève, Raoul Behrend
 Discovery Circumstances: Numbered Minor Planets (15001)-(20000) – Minor Planet Center
 
 

017198
017198
Named minor planets
20000103